Vitello (fl. c. 1270–1285) was a Polish friar, theologian and natural philosopher.

Vitello may also refer to:
 Vitello (crater), an impact crater on the Moon
 Vitello tonnato, an Italian veal dish
 Vitello (film), a 2018 British-Danish animated family comedy-drama film

People with the name
 Vitello Vitelli (1480–1528), Italian knight and condottiero
 Fausto Vitello (1946–2006), American businessman and magazine publisher
 Paul Vitello, American journalist
 Tony Vitello (born 1978), American college baseball player and coach

See also
 
 Vitelli, a prominent family of Umbria